"Black" is a song by American metal band Trivium. It was released as the third single from the band's fifth studio album In Waves.

No music video was made for the song, but an official lyric video debuted on January 23, 2012 via Noisecreep. The song peaked at no. 40 on the Billboard Mainstream Rock Chart on May 11, the band's first charting single on that chart since "The Rising" from 2007.

Track listing

Charts

Personnel
Matt Heafy – lead vocals, rhythm guitar
Corey Beaulieu – lead guitar, backing vocals
Paolo Gregoletto – bass guitar, backing vocals
Nick Augusto – drums

References

2011 songs
2012 singles
Trivium (band) songs
Roadrunner Records singles
Songs written by Matt Heafy
Songs written by Corey Beaulieu
Songs written by Paolo Gregoletto